George Forsyth may refer to 

George Forsyth (footballer) (born 1982), Peruvian international footballer and politician
George Forsyth (harbourmaster) (1843–1894), Fremantle harbourmaster
George Forsyth (trade unionist) (1898–1974), New Zealand unionist and politician
George Alexander Forsyth (1837–1915), American cavalry officer

See also
George Forsythe (1917–1972), computer scientist and mathematician
George I. Forsythe (1918–1987), U.S. Army general